Chakhmaq Bolagh, also rendered as Chakhmakh-bulag or Chakhmaqbolaq or Chaqmaq Bulagh or Khomaq Bolagh may refer to:
 Chakhmaq Bolagh-e Olya
 Chakhmaq Bolagh-e Sofla